Naj, Najbolja is the debut album from Serbian pop singer Marija Šerifović released in 2003. Videos were shot for the songs "Znaj da znam" and "Naj najbolja".

Track listing
"Znaj da znam"
"Sad idi nek' te đavo nosi"
"Naj, najbolja"
"Još jedan korak"
"Ti mi se sviđaš"
"Ti i samo ti"
"Volim ga"
"Za sreću nam malo treba"

External links
 Marija Šerifović Official Page (Serbian and English)

Marija Šerifović albums
2003 albums